Orthornavirae is a kingdom of viruses that have genomes made of ribonucleic acid (RNA), those genomes encoding an RNA-dependent RNA polymerase (RdRp). The RdRp is used to transcribe the viral RNA genome into messenger RNA (mRNA) and to replicate the genome. Viruses in this kingdom also share a number of characteristics involving evolution, including high rates of genetic mutations, recombinations, and reassortments.

Viruses in Orthornavirae belong to the realm Riboviria. They are descended from a common ancestor that may have been a non-viral molecule that encoded a reverse transcriptase instead of an RdRp for replication. The kingdom is subdivided into five phyla that separate member viruses based on their genome type, host range, and genetic similarity. Viruses with three genome types are included: positive-strand RNA viruses, negative-strand RNA viruses, and double-stranded RNA viruses.

Many of the most widely known viral diseases are caused by RNA viruses in the kingdom, which includes coronaviruses, the Ebola virus, influenza viruses, the measles virus, and the rabies virus. The first virus to be discovered, tobacco mosaic virus, belongs to the kingdom. In modern history, RdRp-encoding RNA viruses have caused numerous disease outbreaks, and they infect many economically important crops. Most eukaryotic viruses, including most human, animal, and plant viruses, are RdRp-encoding RNA viruses. In contrast, there are relatively few prokaryotic viruses in the kingdom.

Etymology
The first part of Orthornavirae comes from Greek ὀρθός [orthós], meaning straight, the middle part, rna, refers to RNA, and -virae is the suffix used for virus kingdoms.

Characteristics

Structure

RNA viruses in Orthornavirae typically do not encode many proteins, but most positive-sense, single-stranded (+ssRNA) viruses and some double-stranded RNA (dsRNA) viruses encode a major capsid protein that has a single jelly roll fold, so named because the folded structure of the protein contains a structure that resembles a jelly roll. Many also possess an envelope, a type of lipid membrane that typically surrounds the capsid. In particular, the viral envelope is near-universal among negative-sense, single-stranded (-ssRNA) viruses.

Genome
Viruses in Orthornavirae have three different types of genomes: dsRNA, +ssRNA, and -ssRNA. Single-stranded RNA viruses have either a positive or negative sense strand, and dsRNA viruses have both. This structure of the genome is important in terms of transcription to synthesize viral mRNA as well as replication of the genome, both of which are carried out by the viral enzyme RNA-dependent RNA polymerase (RdRp), also called RNA replicase.

Replication and transcription

Positive-strand RNA viruses
Positive-strand RNA viruses have genomes that can function as mRNA, so transcription is not necessary. However, +ssRNA will produce dsRNA forms as part of the process of replicating their genomes. From the dsRNA, additional positive strands are synthesized, which may be used as mRNA or for genomes for progeny. Because +ssRNA viruses create intermediate dsRNA forms, they have to avoid the host's immune system in order to replicate. +ssRNA viruses accomplish this by replicating in membrane-associated vesicles that are used as replication factories. For many +ssRNA viruses, subgenomic portions of the genome will be transcribed to translate specific proteins, whereas others will transcribe a polyprotein that is cleaved to produce separate proteins.

Negative-strand RNA viruses
Negative-strand RNA viruses have genomes that function as templates from which mRNA can be synthesized directly by RdRp. Replication is the same process but executed on the positive sense antigenome, during which RdRp ignores all transcription signals so that a complete -ssRNA genome can be synthesized. -ssRNA viruses vary between those that initiate transcription by the RdRp creating a cap on the 5'-end (usually pronounced "five prime end") of the genome or by snatching a cap from host mRNA and attaching it to the viral RNA. For many -ssRNA viruses, at the end of transcription, RdRp stutters on a uracil in the genome, synthesizing hundreds of adenines in a row as part of creating a polyadenylated tail for the mRNA. Some -ssRNA viruses are essentially ambisense, and have proteins encoded by both the positive and negative strand, so mRNA is synthesized directly from the genome and from a complementary strand.

Double-stranded RNA viruses
For dsRNA viruses, RdRp transcribes mRNA by using the negative strand as a template. Positive strands may also be used as templates to synthesize negative strands for the construction of genomic dsRNA. dsRNA is not a molecule produced by cells, so cellular life has evolved mechanisms to detect and inactivate viral dsRNA. To counter this, dsRNA viruses typically retain their genomes inside of viral capsid in order to evade the host's immune system.

Evolution
RNA viruses in Orthornavirae experience a high rate of genetic mutations because RdRp is prone to making errors in replication since it typically lacks proofreading mechanisms to repair errors. Mutations in RNA viruses are often influenced by host factors such as dsRNA-dependent adenosine deaminases, which edit viral genomes by changing adenosines to inosines. Mutations in genes that are essential for replication lead to a reduced number of progeny, so viral genomes typically contain sequences that are highly conserved over time with relatively few mutations.

Many RdRp-encoding RNA viruses also experience a high rate of genetic recombination, though rates of recombination vary significantly, with lower rates in -ssRNA viruses and higher rates in dsRNA and +ssRNA viruses. There are two types of recombination: copy choice recombination and reassortment. Copy choice recombination occurs when the RdRp switches templates during synthesis without releasing the prior, newly created RNA strand, which generates a genome of mixed ancestry. Reassortment, which is restricted to viruses with segmented genomes, has segments from different genomes packaged into a single virion, or virus particle, which also produces hybrid progeny.

For reassortment, some segmented viruses package their genomes into multiple virions, which produces genomes that are random mixtures of parents, whereas for those that are packaged into a single virion, typically individual segments are swapped. Both forms of recombination can only occur if more than one virus is present in a cell, and the more alleles are present, the more likely recombination is to occur. A key difference between copy choice recombination and reassortment is that copy choice recombination can occur anywhere in a genome, whereas reassortment swaps fully-replicated segments. Therefore, copy choice recombination can produce non-functional viral proteins whereas reassortment cannot.

The mutation rate of a virus is associated with the rate of genetic recombinations. Higher mutation rates increase both the number of advantageous and disadvantageous mutations, whereas higher rates of recombination allows for beneficial mutations to be separated from deleterious ones. Therefore, higher rates of mutations and recombinations, up to a certain point, improve viruses' ability to adapt. Notable examples of this include reassortments that enable cross-species transmission of influenza viruses, which have led to numerous pandemics, as well as the emergence of drug-resistance influenza strains via mutations that were reassorted.

Phylogenetics

The exact origin of Orthornavirae is not well established, but the viral RdRp shows a relation to the reverse transcriptase (RT) enzymes of group II introns that encode RTs and retrotransposons, the latter of which are self-replicating DNA sequences that integrate themselves into other parts of the same DNA molecule. A larger study (2022) where new lieneages (phyla) were described, has suggested that RNA viruses descend from the RNA world, suggesting that retroelements (retrotransposons and group II introns) originated from an ancestor related to the phylum Lenarviricota and that members of a newly discovered Taraviricota lineage (phylum) would be the ancestors of all RNA viruses. According to this study the genomes of both dsRNA, +ssRNA and -ssRNA evolved independently and were altered several times in evolution.

Classification
RNA viruses that encode RdRp are assigned to the kingdom Orthornavirae, which contains five official phyla, four unofficial phyla and several taxa that are unassigned to a phylum due to lack of information. The five phyla are separated based on the genome types, host ranges, and genetic similarity of member viruses.
 Phylum: Duplornaviricota, which contains dsRNA viruses that infect prokaryotes and eukaryotes, which do not cluster with members of Pisuviricota, and which encode a capsid composed of a 60 homo- or heterodimers of capsid proteins organized on a lattice with pseudo T = 2 symmetry
 Phylum: Kitrinoviricota, which contains +ssRNA viruses that infect eukaryotes and which do not cluster with members of Pisuviricota
 Phylum: Lenarviricota, which contains +ssRNA viruses that infect prokaryotes and eukaryotes and which do not cluster with members of Kitrinoviricota
 Phylum: Negarnaviricota, which contains -ssRNA viruses that infect eukaryotes.
 Phylum: Pisuviricota, which contains +ssRNA and dsRNA viruses that infect eukaryotes and which do not cluster with other phyla
 (proposed) Phylum: Taraviricota, which contains basal viruses that most likely infect prokaryotes with deficient cell walls and eukaryotic mitochondria similar to mitoviruses (specif and is the first phylum discovered by the Tara Oceans expedition ("tara").
 (proposed) Phylum: Arctiviricota, which contains an -ssRNA viruses abundant in the arctic ("arcti") that probably infects algae
 (proposed) Phylum: Paraxenoviricota, which contains +ssRNA viruses which contain strange ("paraxeno") RdRp domain sequences and morphology
 (proposed) Phylum: Pomiviricota, which contains two +ssRNA viruses which infect ambiguous hosts 

The unassigned taxa are listed hereafter (-viridae denotes family and -virus denotes genus).
 Birnaviridae
 Permutotetraviridae
 Botybirnavirus

The kingdom contains three groups in the Baltimore classification system, which groups viruses together based on their manner of mRNA synthesis, and which is often used alongside standard virus taxonomy, which is based on evolutionary history. Those three groups are Group III: dsRNA viruses, Group IV: +ssRNA viruses, and Group V: -ssRNA viruses.

Disease
RNA viruses are associated with a wide range of disease, including many of the most widely known viral diseases. Notable disease-causing viruses in Orthornavirae include:

 Coronaviruses
 Crimean-Congo hemorrhagic fever orthonairovirus
 Dengue virus
 Ebolavirus
 Hantaviruses
 Hepatitis A virus
 Hepatitis C virus
 Hepatitis E virus
 Human orthopneumovirus
 Influenza viruses
 Japanese encephalitis virus
 Lassa mammarenavirus
 Measles morbillivirus
 Mumps orthorubulavirus
 Norovirus
 Poliovirus
 Rabies lyssavirus
 Rhinoviruses
 Rift Valley fever phlebovirus
 Rotavirus
 Rubella virus
 West Nile virus
 Yellow fever virus
 Zika virus

Animal viruses in Orthornavirae include orbiviruses, which cause various diseases in ruminants and horses, including Bluetongue virus, African horse sickness virus, Equine encephalosis virus, and epizootic hemorrhagic disease virus. The vesicular stomatitis virus causes disease in cattle, horses, and pigs. Bats harbor many viruses including ebolaviruses and henipaviruses, which also can cause disease in humans. Similarly, arthropod viruses in the Flavivirus and Phlebovirus genera are numerous and often transmitted to humans. Coronaviruses and influenza viruses cause disease in various vertebrates, including bats, birds, and pigs.

Plant viruses in the kingdom are numerous and infect many economically important crops. Tomato spotted wilt virus is estimated to cause more than 1 billion USD in damages annually, affecting more than 800 plant species including chrysanthemum, lettuce, peanut, pepper, and tomato. Cucumber mosaic virus infects more than 1,200 plant species and likewise causes significant crop losses. Potato virus Y causes significant reductions in yield and quality for pepper, potato, tobacco, and tomato, and Plum pox virus is the most important virus among stone fruit crops. Brome mosaic virus, while not causing significant economic losses, is found throughout much of the world and primarily infects grasses, including cereals.

History
Diseases caused by RNA viruses in Orthornavirae have been known throughout much of history, but their cause was only discovered in modern times. As a whole, RNA viruses were discovered during a time period of major advancements in molecular biology, including the discovery of mRNA as the immediate carrier of genetic information for protein synthesis. Tobacco mosaic virus was discovered in 1898 and was the first virus to be discovered. Viruses in the kingdom that are transmitted by arthropods have been a key target in the development of vector control, which often aims to prevent viral infections. In  modern history, numerous disease outbreaks have been caused by RdRp-encoding RNA viruses, including outbreaks caused by coronaviruses, ebola, and influenza.

Orthornavirae was established in 2019 as a kingdom within the realm Riboviria, intended to accommodate all RdRp-encoding RNA viruses. Prior to 2019, Riboviria was established in 2018 and included only RdRp-encoding RNA viruses. In 2019, Riboviria was expanded to also include reverse transcribing viruses, placed under the kingdom Pararnavirae, so Orthornavirae was established to separate RdRp-encoding RNA viruses from reversing transcribing viruses.

Gallery

Notes

References

RNA
RNA viruses
Viruses
Kingdoms (biology)
Riboviria